Postal addresses in the Philippines are similar in format to those in many other parts of the world. They are especially used to locate areas in the Philippines.

Address elements
Philippine addresses always contain the name of the sender, the building number and thoroughfare, the barangay where the building is located, the city or municipality where the barangay is located and, in most cases, the province where the city or municipality is located. In the case of Metro Manila, however, provinces are omitted and, in the case of Manila, include the district name instead of the barangay. ZIP codes are also part of the typical Philippine address.

Address format

Street, e.g. BLDG 1A5U11 MRH SITE 4 TALA
District, e.g. TALA 1
Barangay, e.g. BARANGAY 188 ZONE 16
Postal Code, then City / Municipality, e.g. 1427 CALOOCAN
Province (or if in the National Capital Region, Metro Manila, as with this example address)

Postal codes' necessity
PhilPost recommends the use of postal codes in the country and correct addressing. However, most residents do not use, let alone know how to use ZIP codes, and thus the codes are usually omitted. According to PhilPost, the proper use of ZIP codes assists in letter sorting and reduces letter misrouting.

See also
Communications in the Philippines
Philippine Postal Corporation
ZIP codes in the Philippines

References

Communications in the Philippines
Postal system of the Philippines
Philippines